The CC41 Utility logo was a British Board of Trade requirement that appeared on footwear, utility furniture, textiles, and utility clothing for just over ten years from 1941. CC41 designated that the item met the government's austerity regulations.

The CC41 logo was designed by Reginald Shipp.

Second World War

By 1941, with the need to produce clothing and other war essentials for the expanding armed services during the Second World War, many items were rationed. Certain raw materials could no longer be imported, and those that could were directed towards the war effort. Food rationing had already been reintroduced in January 1940. Non-rationed items saw their price surge, and clothing saw large mark-ups in price, well above the cost of living.

The government introduced Limitation of Supply Orders that forced manufacturers to produce only a fraction of their pre-war amounts. By April 1940, the limits on cloth were having a major impact with a 25% cut in wool and rayon, and a 75% cut in linen. As a consequence, manufacturers ended the production of any loss-making lines which led to calls for clothing rationing to be introduced. The prime minister, Winston Churchill, believed that the general public would not accept this change.

In 1941 Oliver Lyttleton, the President of the Board of Trade, managed to introduce clothes rationing. Churchill, although thankful the public accepted the move, replaced Lyttleton with Hugh Dalton (a Labour member of the coalition government since 1940) a month later. Churchill was fully aware that rationing and conscription were now necessary as Britain became involved in a 'total war' spanning the globe.

Shortly after Dalton took office he appointed Metford Watkins as Director of Civilian Clothing at the Board of Trade. Watkins, aware of the high price of clothes at the time, promised to introduce cheaper clothes via 'austerity' provisions but not using standardisation. Shortly afterwards, the government announced the production of 'national footwear'. The austerity provisions governed exactly what could or could not be used in the manufacture of clothes and shoes (for example, number of buttons, pleats or pockets, height of heels, amount of lace or embroidery, no turn-ups on trousers and no double-breasted suits).

With the introduction of purchase tax in October 1941 items were taxed at different rates and necessities were designated as tax-free. This stimulated production, reduced waste and through higher taxation curtailed the production of expensive clothing.

Utility items

Utility cloths were introduced and manufacturers were supplied with raw materials on a quota system. Manufacturers who agreed to increase production of utility cloth would receive a higher quota. The public bought Utility clothing as it was tax-free.

By September 1942 40 cloths had been specified (19 wool, 16 cotton, four rayon and one locknit) which all now utilised the CC41 Utility mark, designed for the Directorate of Civilian Clothing by Reginald Shipp.

The symbol was to appear on clothing, footwear and furniture and the single, identifiable mark quickly allowed the public to know if an item was tax-free or not. The symbol came to represent cheap, but reliable goods. Within the Utility footwear there were sometimes bands for quality difference. Ladies' shoes would feature the Utility mark and either W1, W2 or W3 which had a different and increasing price range.

See also
 Incorporated Society of London Fashion Designers (IncSoc)

References

External links 
 A brief introduction to CC41

Austerity in the United Kingdom (1939–1954)
United Kingdom home front during World War II